Oružjem Protivu Otmičara (Serbian Cyrillic: Оружјем Противу Отмичара, trans. With Weapons Against Kidnappers) is a Serbian pop punk/power pop band from Zrenjanin.

History

1990s 
The band was formed by two teenage friends, bass guitarist Nikola Pavković and drummer Vladimir Jovanović, and named after a children's book. The band did not record any material and after the two joined Instant Karma, the band ceased to exist.

In 1992, having left Instant Karma, Pavković reformed the band, soon switching to guitar, with bass guitarist Draga Antov. The rest of the lineup varied until Dragana Mrkajić (guitar, vocals) and Darko Kurjak (drums) became permanent members. Together they recorded their self-titled debut, which promoted the band's power pop style. Pavković wrote the song lyrics, featuring individualistic, suicidal and self-questioning themes. The album was recorded at the "Go-Go" studio from January 5 to January 15, 1995. The song "Ptica" ("Bird") was inspired by The Muffs song "Everywhere I Go". After the release of the debut, Kurjak joined Partibrejkers and was replaced by Jovanović, who returned to the band having worked with Gluve Kučke and Instant Karma.

The new lineup recorded the band's second album, BarbieCue, which, produced by Marinko Vukomanović, featured the sound similar to one on the debut, with a cover versions of Zana hit "Mladiću moj" ("My Boy") and a cover of Sugar 1992 single "A Good Idea" entitled "Dobra ideja". Guest appearances featured Vlada Negovanović on acoustic guitar and Saša Lokner on keyboards. The lyrics for the album were written, beside Pavković, by Draga Antov and Dragana Mrkajić. In 1997, the band's song "U koloru" ("In Color") appeared on the various artists compilation Ovo je zemlja za nas?!? Radio Boom 93 (1992-1997) (This Is Land for Us?!? Radio Boom 93 (1992-1997)). The band's two songs, "Mladiću moj" and "Saša Ajdanov", appeared as soundtrack for the Darko Bajić movie Balkanska pravila.

Due to the popularity of the album, the debut was rereleased on CD and a remixed version of the second album was released under the name BarbieMix. However, Draga Antov joined Veliki Prezir and the band ceased to exist. Pavković formed the band Kineska Kreda, and Dragana Mrkajić started working in the Zeleno Zvono club. Soon, the two returned to the original idea of the band, and with Kineska Kreda bassist Aleksandar Tolimir and drummer Marko Živković reformed the band. The new lineup recorded the album Komadić koji nedostaje (The Missing Piece), which got the name after the book by Shel Silverstein, and the cover of the album is the one used as the book cover. The album featured guest appearances by Kanal Tvid member Miša Grujić and Alek Aleksov on keyboards, Bajaga i Instruktori member Miroslav Cvetković did percussion and Vlada Negovanović, who was also the album producer, recorded acoustic guitar parts. The band's recognizable style was now completed with string sections. The song "Traži me" ("Look for Me") featured the lyrics from a poem by Miroslav Antić, and the song "Voajer" ("Voyeur") was written by Dragana Mrkajić. The band disbanded in 1999, during the NATO bombing of Yugoslavia. The band's songs "Mladiću moj", "Ptica" and "1000" appeared on the various artists compilation Recordings.

2000s 
The comeback album Maštoplov (Dreammachine) presented a new vocalist, Ivana Cvejin, who was at the time a high school graduate. The album featured the cover version of the song "Budi tu" ("Be There") and a rerecorded version of the track "Voajer". The lineup stopped performing in 2004, and the band was inactive until 2007, when the new lineup which, beside Pavković, included Zarko Dunić (bass), Ivana Radmanovac (guitar, vocals) and Srđan Dević (drums), released the album Znaš ko te pozdravio? (Do You Know Who Sends His Greetings?). The album featured the cover version of Slađana Milošević song "Miki, Miki". On May 9, 2008, the band performed as an opening act for The Damned in Novi Sad.

In 2009, Multimedia Records released a compilation album Groovanje devedesete uživo featuring a live recording of the band's song "Dobra ideja" (released on the compilation as "Good Idea"), recorded live at the Belgrade KST on November 11, 1995.

2010s 
In June 2010, the lineup changed, featuring new bass guitarist Marko Čokulov and vocalist Jovana Oljača, and the band started working on a new studio release. In 2014, the band released the single "Panika" ("Panic").

2015 - 2018
In the summer of 2015, the band changes the lineup again, featuring vocalist Jovana Popović, guitarist Pavle Kirćanski, and drummer Nebojša Durmanović. This lineup saw Nikola Pavković return to his original instrument - the bass guitar. They've released two singles - "Progutaj Me" ("Swallow Me") and "Vrati Mi Snove" ("Gimme Back My Dreams"). In January 2016, the band changed the lineup again and with the release of the third single "Lica" ("Faces"), the new singer Verica Marinković was introduced. The band released another video in April 2016 titled "Marina" ("Marina"). The band has held its last concert on 26.04.2018 on the R.A.F Reafirmator Fest, after which it went on hiatus.

Legacy 
The lyrics of 3 songs by the band were featured in Petar Janjatović's book Pesme bratstva, detinjstva & potomstva: Antologija ex YU rok poezije 1967 - 2007 (Songs of Brotherhood, Childhood & Offspring: Anthology of Ex YU Rock Poetry 1967 - 2007).

Discography

Studio albums

Remix albums

Singles

See also 
Punk rock in Yugoslavia

References 

 EX YU ROCK enciklopedija 1960–2006, Janjatović Petar;

External links 
 Official Youtube channel
 OPO at Discogs
 OPO at Last.fm
 OPO at B92.fm

Serbian pop punk groups
Serbian power pop groups
Musical groups from Zrenjanin
Musical groups established in 1992